Tapinella is a genus of three inedible fungi in the Tapinellaceae family. The genus was circumscribed by the French mycologist Jean-Edouard Gilbert in 1931.

References

Boletales
Boletales genera